The Administrative Police of the Third Reich , was not only responsible for the internal administration of the police services, but also for many administrative functions which in other countries were performed by purely civilian agencies.

State police departments
The police commissioners of the state police departments in cities were police lawyers of the administrative police with the grades of Polizeidirektor or Polizeipräsident. The staff of the administrative police consisted of police lawyers, police administrative officials, as well as the jailers of the police jails.

Mission
The administrative police of the state police departments handled the following type of matters:
 Financial administration of the state police department.
 Passports, control of aliens, civil registration (including the Nuremberg Laws), registration of conscripts.
 Traffic regulations, waterways and fire inspection.
 Control of trade establishments and their licences.
 Regulations on punishable offences, welfare matters, health inspection, food and veterinary inspection.

Municipal police departments
The municipal police departments handled the same type of business as the state police departments. In addition in handled the type of police duties that was reserved for the municipal authorities, such as building inspection, forest police, housing inspection, homelessness, and school attendance. Only the larger cities without a state police department had a special staff of Gemeindeverwaltungspolizeibeamten, municipal administrative police officials. In smaller cities and in towns the administrative police functions were handled by the regular civil municipal administration.

Personnel
Administrative police officials belonged to the same four different career tracks as the general civil service.

Career tracks and recruitment

Grades and pay

Sources:

Median annual wage for an industrial worker was 1,495 RM in 1939. In the same year the median salary for a privately employed white-collar worker was 2,772 RM.

Promotions
New rules for promotions were issued in 1943.

Polizeiassistenten were eligible for promotion to Polizeisekretär after two years in the grade. Participation in a SS-Fuehrer course was mandatory for SS-members, but not for officials who didn't belong to the SS. Polizeisekretäre were eligible for promotion to Polizeiobersekretär after three years in the grade. Participation in a leadership course was mandatory for those not members of the SS. 
 
Polizeiinspektoren were eligible for promotion to Polizeioberinspektor after three years in the grade. Polizeioberinspektoren were eligible for promotion to Polizeirat after two years in the grade. Regierungsamtmänner and Polizeiräte in RSHA were eligible for promotion to Amtsrat after five years in the grade. Amtsräte were eligible for promotion to Regierungsrat after five years in the grade.

References

Literature
 Boberach, Heinz (1997). Ämter, Abkürzungen, Aktionen des NS-Staates. München.
 Mollo, Andrew (1971). Uniforms of the SS - Volume 5 - Sicherheitsdienst und Sicherheitspolizei 1931–1945. London. 
 Supreme Headquarters Allied Expeditionary Force (1945). The German Police. London.

Police units of Nazi Germany